Rezé (Gallo: Rezae) is a commune (municipality) and former bishopric in the Loire-Atlantique department in the Pays de la Loire region of western France. It is a southern suburb of Nantes.

It was also called Ratiate in the Middle Ages and Rezay in the High Middle Ages.

History
Rezé dates back to the Roman era, when it was known as Portus Ratiatus (port of Rezé) and Ratiatum Pictonum Portus (picton port of Rezé). Being populated by the Ambilatres tribe - Armorican Gauls - Rezé was an important port on the south shore of the Loire and a place for meetings and trade between the various Celtic tribes of the region (Veneti, Namnetes, Ambilatres, Andecavis and Pictones).

In 510 a Latin Catholic Diocese of Rezé was established on territory split off from the Diocese of Poitiers. It was suppressed 851, its territory being reassigned to the nearby then Diocese of Nantes. No incumbents or other details available.

It has ruins of Gallo-Roman settlement and a priory of Saint Lucien.

In the feudal age, it was the capital of the Pays de Retz within the Duchy of Brittany.

Geography 

The commune is surrounded by the communes of Nantes, Vertou, Les Sorinières, Pont-Saint-Martin and Bouguenais. It is limited north by the Loire, east by the Sèvre Nantaise and the Ilette, west by the Jaguère and south by the boulevard périphérique of Nantes. Rezé-Pont-Rousseau station has rail connections to Pornic, Saint-Gilles-Croix-de-Vie and Nantes.

Monuments
Unité d'Habitation of Nantes-Rezé, a monumental apartment building designed by Le Corbusier

Municipal administration 
Since the municipal elections of 1977, the communal council has always been filled in the first round of voting.

Population

International relations 

Rezé is twinned with:
  Saint-Wendel (Germany) since 1973
  Aïn Defla (Algeria) since 1985
  Dundalk (Ireland) since 1990
  Villa El Salvador (Peru) since 1991
  Ineu (Romania) since 2003
  Rural Community of Ronkh, Diawar (Senegal) since 2003
  Abu Dis (Palestine) since 2007

See also 
 Communes of the Loire-Atlantique department
 List of Catholic dioceses in France

References

External links 

 Official website 
 GCatholic - former bishopric
 Nouveau Larousse Illustré

Communes of Loire-Atlantique